The Sony α 500 (DSLR-A500) is a midrange-level digital single-lens reflex camera (DSLR) marketed by Sony, which was released in 2009.

It features live view and body-integrated image stabilization. It has a 12.3 megapixel APS-C CMOS sensor. The camera itself received mostly good reviews, with its fast continuous  shot function, much better image quality for photos taken in bad light situations compared to 3xx series and overall very good price/performance ratio. Inability to record videoclips, is the mostly often criticized point. 

Compared to A550, A500 features less detailed LiveView LCD, 12 contra 14 MPixel sensor resolution and absence of 7 frame/s continuous shot without autofocus mode. Both cameras also feature unique auto-HDR mode.

References

External links 

500